Surinder Films (SF) is an Indian media and entertainment company headquartered in Kolkata, West Bengal. Apart from producing and distributing Bengali films, SF is also in the business of TV content production. The other division of the company include digital content production for OTT platforms.

Films

Released

Television

References

Indian film studios
Film distributors of India
Film production companies of India
Entertainment companies of India
Entertainment companies established in 2009
Film production companies based in Kolkata
2009 establishments in West Bengal